Toby Onwumere  (born February 1, 1990) is a Nigerian and American actor known for the role of Capheus in the second season of the Netflix original series Sense8.

Early life 
Onwumere was born in Nigeria, and raised in Mansfield, Texas. Before being cast in Sense8, Onwumere graduated from University of California, San Diego's graduate acting program with an MFA. He completed his undergraduate acting training at the University of Evansville in Indiana.

Career

Stage 
Onwumere has appeared on stage with Santa Cruz Shakespeare where he played Macduff in Macbeth and Cleton in The Liar. He also appeared in the previous incarnation of the festival; Shakespeare Santa Cruz where he played in The Taming of the Shrew and Henry V. He also appear on the series Empire.

Screen 
Onwumere replaced British actor Aml Ameen, who played the role of Capheus in season one of Sense8. Onwumere made his debut as Capheus on the December 2016 Christmas special of Sense8.
He also played Kai, a war correspondent and love interest of Jamal Lyon in the fifth season of Empire.  Onwumere reunited with Lana Wachowski in the fourth installment of The Matrix film series in 2022.

References

External links

Living people
American male television actors
American male stage actors
Male actors from Houston
Nigerian emigrants to the United States
Nigerian male stage actors
Nigerian male television actors
University of California, San Diego alumni
21st-century American male actors
21st-century Nigerian male actors
1990 births
University of Evansville alumni
Igbo people